Newbarns is an area and electoral ward of Barrow-in-Furness, Cumbria, England. It is bordered by Hawcoat, Parkside, Risedale and Roose, the local population stood at 5,515 in 2001, decreasing to 5,487 at the 2011 Census. 

Newbarns covers an area of 2.78 square kilometres and lies east of Abbey Road, encompassing Furness Abbey in its entirety, Barrow Sixth Form College and St. Bernard's Catholic High School. Newbarns is extremely diverse, with the majority of the south of the ward being amongst the 6% to 10% most deprived areas of the country, while north Newbarns contains Croslands Park, Barrow's most expensive street and is within the 25% of least deprived areas nationwide.

The ward itself will be combined with Hawcoat ward in April 2023 following formation of the new Westmorland and Furness Local Authority.

History
The area centred on Hector Street marks the original Newbarns village which pre dates much of Barrow and originally lay within the Parish of Dalton-in-Furness. Sandylands Farmhouse is Grade II listed and is the oldest surviving building in Newbarns, dating from 1623. Several other nearby 17th, 18th and 19th century houses are also listed buildings.

Demographics

References

Districts of Barrow-in-Furness
Wards of Barrow-in-Furness